The Derba, also known as Derbe (Cerbe) or Dzherba, is a river in Yakutia (Sakha Republic), Russia.

The river flows across an uninhabited area of the Lensky District.

Course  
The Derba is a left tributary of the Lena. It is formed at the confluence of the Kyuyokh-Ottakh (Кюёх-Оттоох) and Mas-Turukhtaakh (Мас-Турухтаах) rivers in the eastern fringes of the Central Siberian Plateau, to the south of the basin of the Vilyuy. The river heads in a roughly southern direction across taiga areas dotted with lakes. In its lower course it flows to the east of the Nyuya as it reaches the Lena floodplain and flows slowly in a swampy area.

There are 330 lakes in its basin. The Derba freezes yearly between October and May.

See also
List of rivers of Russia

References

External links 
Fishing & Tourism in Yakutia

Central Siberian Plateau
Rivers of the Sakha Republic